Anastasiya Igorevna Cherniavskaya (born 29 May 1992) is a Belarusian badminton player. She competed at the 2015 Baku and 2019 Minsk European Games.

Achievements

BWF International Challenge/Series (1 title, 1 runner-up) 
Women's doubles

  BWF International Challenge tournament
  BWF International Series tournament
  BWF Future Series tournament

References

External links 
 

1992 births
Living people
Sportspeople from Minsk
Belarusian female badminton players
Badminton players at the 2015 European Games
Badminton players at the 2019 European Games
European Games competitors for Belarus